"Like It's Christmas" is a Christmas song by American group Jonas Brothers. It was released on November 8, 2019, and is the band's final release of the year. It is the fourth Christmas song released by them after "Girl of My Dreams" in 2007, "Joyful Kings" in 2008, and "Summertime Anthem" in 2009.

Background
The group announced the song's name and release date on November 4, 2019.

Commercial performance
"Like It's Christmas" reached number one on the US Adult Contemporary chart in December 2019, becoming the Jonas Brothers' second number one on the chart. It also reached a chart peak of No. 44 on the Billboard Hot 100 on the week ending January 4, 2020.

Live performances
The band performed the song on their Happiness Begins Tour beginning on December 4, 2019 in Omaha. On December 13, 2019, they performed the song along with the singles "Burnin' Up", "Sucker", "Cool" and "Only Human".
They performed the song live on an episode of the Netflix show Dash & Lily, produced by Nick Jonas.

Credits and personnel
Credits adapted from Tidal.

Musicians

 Mike Elizondo – guitar, bass guitar
 Jason Evigan – guitar, background vocals
 Ben Rice – guitar
 Gian Stone – guitar, keyboards, programmer, background vocals
 Freddy Wexler – background vocals
 Annika Wells – background vocals
 Donnell Butler – background vocals
 Jerry Hey – horn arranger
 Nick Blount – keyboards
 Kurt Thum – keyboards
 Daniel Higgins – saxophone
 Bill Reichenbach Jr. – trombone
 Gary Grant – trumpet
 Wayne Bergeron – trumpet

Technical

 Gian Stone – producer, vocal producer, engineer
 Mike Elizondo – co-producer
 Jason Evigan – co-producer, vocal producer
 Freddy Wexler – co-producer, vocal producer
 Lionel Crasta – engineer
 Rafael Fadul – engineer
 Andrew Hey – engineer
 Ben Rice – engineer
 Ryan Tedder – executive producer
 Randy Merrill – mastering engineer
 John Hanes – mix engineer
 Serban Ghenea – mixer

Charts

Weekly charts

Year-end charts

All-time charts

Certifications

See also
 List of Billboard Adult Contemporary number ones of 2019

References

2019 singles
2019 songs
American Christmas songs
Jonas Brothers songs
Songs written by Joe Jonas
Songs written by Nick Jonas
Song recordings produced by Ryan Tedder
Songs written by Kevin Jonas
Songs written by Jason Evigan
Songs written by Freddy Wexler